Club Atlético Atenas de San Carlos is a football club from San Carlos, Maldonado in Uruguay. They currently play in the Uruguayan Segunda División.

History
Atenas played two seasons in the Uruguayan Primera División, 2009–10 and 2014–15. Their debut at the second level was on May 5, 2002. That day they played against Racing Club de Montevideo, drawing the game 1–1.

They are the most successful team from outside Montevideo, having won many tournaments in their regional league, and are one of the top-winners of the Campeonato de Clubes Campeones del Interior (the national tournament for Uruguayan amateur clubs).
Además, este club es notorio hijo del Club Deportivo Maldonado

Honours

Local
Liga Carolina de Fútbol (San Carlos): 23
1954, 1961, 1962, 1963, 1964, 1965, 1966, 1969, 1970, 1971, 1973, 1974, 1978, 1979, 1985, 1986, 1987, 1988, 1989, 1990, 1991, 1992, 1993

Departmental
Campeonato Departamental de Maldonado: 12
1957, 1964, 1970, 1971, 1973, 1974, 1984, 1985, 1988, 1990, 1991, 1993
Liga Mayor de Maldonado: 3
1995, 1996, 2000

Regional
Campeonato del Este: 4
1965, 1975, 1985, 1986

National
Campeonato de Clubes Campeones del Interior: 4
1965, 1975, 1976, 2001
Supercopa de Clubes Campeones del Interior: 3
1971, 1972, 1974

Current squad

Out on loan

External links
 C.A. Atenas' Official Website

San Carlos, Uruguay
Football clubs in Uruguay
Association football clubs established in 1928
1928 establishments in Uruguay